Worldwide Entertainment is a record label founded in Atlanta, Georgia, US, by Kevin Wales. It has contracts with several artist including 112, Jagged Edge, Monica, Mario Winans, Faith Evans, B5, and Khalil.

Current artists
Khalil (Worldwide/Slip-n-Slide/Interscope Records)
Mario Winans (Bad Boy/Worldwide/Interscope)
Brandon Evans (Worldwide/Bad Boy)

Former artists
Lil Zane (Worldwide/Priority/Capitol) (1999 - 2002)
B5 (band) (Worldwide/Bad Boy/Atlantic) (2001 - 2009)
112 (band) (Worldwide/Bad Boy/Def Jam/Arista) (1994 - 2003)
Jagged Edge (American group) (Worldwide) (1995 - 1997)
Monica (Worldwide) (1993 - 1995)
Faith Evans (Worldwide) (1993 - 1995)

American record labels